The 2022 Rhythmic Gymnastics European Championships was the 38th edition of the Rhythmic Gymnastics European Championships, which took place on 15-19 June 2022 at the Expo Tel Aviv in Tel Aviv, Israel.

Participating countries

Updated on May 30th 2022. 

Russia and Belarus banned from attending all international competitions.

Competition schedule
Wednesday June 15
10:00–11:40 Junior individual qualification & Team ranking (Hoop, Ball, Clubs, Ribbon - SET A)
12:00–13:40 Junior individual qualification & Team ranking (Hoop, Ball, Clubs, Ribbon - SET B)
15:00–16:20 Junior individual qualification & Team ranking (Hoop, Ball, Clubs, Ribbon - SET C)
16:40–18:10 Junior individual qualification & Team ranking (Hoop, Ball, Clubs, Ribbon - SET D)
18:10–18:20 Award ceremony Junior Individuals Team
Thursday June 16
09:00–10:50 Set A Senior Individuals qualifications (hoop & ball)
11:05–12:55 Set B Senior Individuals qualifications (hoop & ball)
14:10–16:00 Set C Senior Individuals qualifications (hoop & ball)
16:15–17:55 Set D Senior Individuals qualifications (hoop & ball)
19:30–20:30 Junior Individuals Hoop & Ball Finals
20:30–21:30 Junior Individuals Clubs & Ribbon Finals
21:30–21:45 Award ceremony Junior individuals Apparatus finals
Friday June 17
10:00–11:50 Set C Senior Individuals qualifications (clubs & ribbon)
12:05–13:55 Set D Senior Individuals qualifications (clubs & ribbon)
15:10-17:00 Set A Senior Individuals qualifications (clubs & ribbon)
17:00–17:30 Opening Ceremony
17:30–19:20 Set B Senior Individuals qualifications (clubs & ribbon)
Saturday June 18
11:00–13:25 Senior Individuals AA Final (hoop, ball, clubs, ribbon – SET B)
13:40–16:05 Senior Individuals AA Final (hoop, ball, clubs, ribbon – SET A)
16:05–16:20 Award Ceremony AA Seniors Individuals
17:30–18:50 Senior Groups (5 hoops and 3 ribbons & 2 balls)
19:00–20:20 Senior Groups (5 hoops and 3 ribbons & 2 balls)
20:20–20:45 Award Ceremony AA Senior Groups
20:20–20:45 Award Ceremony Team (Senior Individuals and Senior Groups)
Sunday June 19
10:00–11:00 Senior Individuals Hoop & Ball Finals
11:15–12:15 Senior Individuals Clubs & Ribbon Finals
12:15-12:30 Award Ceremony Senior Individual Apparatus finals
13:00–13:40 Senior Groups 5 Hoops Final
13:55–14:35 Senior Groups 3 Ribbons + 2 Balls Final
14:45–15:00 Award Ceremony Senior Groups Apparatus finals
15:00–15:10 Closing Ceremony
Source:

Medal winners

Results

Team

Junior

Senior

Senior Individual

All-Around

Hoop

Ball

Clubs

Ribbon

Groups

Group All-Around

5 Hoops

3 Ribbons + 2 Balls

Medal count

References

Rhythmic Gymnastics European Championships
European Rhythmic Gymnastics Championships
Gymnastics competitions in Israel
Rhythmic Gymnastics European Championships
Gymnastics
Gymnastics
Rhythmic